Zsolt Horváth (born 19 May 1988 in Pécs) is a retired Hungarian professional football player and television sports commentator. He was active in Hungarian national leagues from 2006 to 2017. He holds a degree in law.

Club

References

Profile at HLSZ

1988 births
Living people
Sportspeople from Pécs
Hungarian footballers
Association football forwards
Pécsi MFC players
MTK Budapest FC players
Debreceni VSC players
Nemzeti Bajnokság I players